Lizzie Antony is an Indian actress working in the Tamil film industry, mostly as a supporting actress. She is best known for her roles in Thanga Meenkal (2013) and Taramani (2017). Apart from films, Antony has performed in advertisements, short films and web series.

Career
Thanga Meenkal, directed by acclaimed film maker Ram, helped her to get noticed as her character Stella miss, an English teacher in a private school, who is a stickler for discipline was appreciated by the critics as well as the audience.

Antony is a post graduate of commerce from Madras University and a trained classical dancer. Her natural performance in the sleeper hit Taramani was widely appreciated and later she played the pair of Mammootty in the commercial and critically successful film Peranbu and her mother act in Ispade Rajavum Idhaya Raniyum, has made her a recognizable actress of Tamil films. She played Sirimavo Bandaranaike, the former Prime Minister of Sri Lanka in the OTT release Methagu.

Filmography

Films

Web series

References

External links

Living people
Indian film actresses
Actresses in Tamil cinema
21st-century Indian actresses
Year of birth missing (living people)